World Heritage Channel is a documentary channel available in Asia. World Heritage Channel is operated by Warner Bros. Discovery International. It first launched in Philippines through ACCION on April 20, 2015.

World Heritage Channel's programming categories include culture, travel, history, and natural heritage. The channel's content is intended to provide viewers an inspiring experience to the most famous places on earth, such as UNESCO's World Heritage Sites.
 
World Heritage Channel's programming consists of acquired, first-run content for the region from documentary makers. Noteworthy shows include The World Heritage Site, Journey to Natural World Heritage Sites and Beautiful Planet. Asian documentaries include Asia's Monarchies and Asia Rising. Travel documentaries on the channel include Travel Bug and Paradise Asia. Turner has also picked up several series narrated by David Attenborough - David Attenborough's Conquest of the Skies 3D and Flying Monsters 3D.

The channel is available in HD with Chinese, Malaysian, Indonesian and Thai subtitles. The channel has selected video-on-demand content and catch-up rights.

Key shows

 Asia's Monarchies
 David Attenborough's Conquest of the Skies
 David Attenborough's Flying Monsters
 Giants of the Deep
 Journey to Natural World Heritage Sites
 Sacred Sites: Ireland
 Must See! Must Eat! Must Do! Taiwan
 The Travel Bug
 The World Heritage Site

References

Documentary television channels
Warner Bros. Discovery Asia-Pacific
Warner Bros. Discovery networks